The 2011–12 season of Hannover 96 began on 26 June with their first friendly match.

Off-season
Christian Pander of Schalke 04 became the first official signing of Hannover's 2011–12 season. The next two signings were Polonia Warszawa forward Artur Sobiech and Norwegen Henning Hauger. The remaining signings were Daniel Royer and Samuel Radlinger from SV Ried. Hannover brought Deniz Aycicek and Erdal Akdarı from the youth setup.

After losing his starter's spot, goalkeeper Florian Fromlowitz departed for DFB-Pokal runners-up MSV Duisburg. Constant Djakpa finished his loan and returned to Bayer Leverkusen, while American DaMarcus Beasley left after one season to join Mexican club Puebla after an injury-struck season left him surplus to requirements.

During January, Hannover 96 signed Mame Biram Diouf from Manchester United for a reported £1.5 million on a two-year deal. He made his debut against Hertha BSC as a substitute, then started his first game in a Hannover shirt against Mainz 05.

Squad

Friendlies

Season results

Bundesliga

The 2011–12 Bundesliga campaign began on 6 August when Hannover played in the opening game of the season against Hoffenheim.

Matches

League table

DFB-Pokal
Hannover kicked off the 2011–12 DFB-Pokal against FC Anker Wismar in Lübeck, where they advanced to the second round with a 6–0 victory.

Europa League

Hannover 96 qualified for the play-off round of the 2011–12 UEFA Europa League by finishing fourth in the Bundesliga in 2010–11.

Play-off Round

After beating Sevilla 3–2 on aggregate in the play-offs, Hannover 96 advanced to Group B of the 2011–12 UEFA Europa League.

Group stage

Knockout phase

After winning 3–1 on aggregate, Hannover 96 advance to the round of 16 to play Standard Liège.

After winning 6–2 on aggregate, Hannover 96 advance to the quarterfinals to play Atlético Madrid.

Hannover 96 lose 2–4 on aggregate.

Goalscorers

All competitions

Bundesliga

UEFA Europa League

DFB-Pokal

|-  style="text-align:left; background:#dcdcdc;"
| colspan="12"|Last updated: 7 May 2012
|-

Reserve team

Hannover's reserve team play in the fourth tier Regionalliga Nord and are coached by Jürgen Willmann.

Squad

References

Hannover 96 seasons
Hannover 96 season 2011-12
Hannover 96